Redtribe was an Australian video game developer that was co-founded in 2003 by game developer and entrepreneur Chris Mosely and Samantha Robson.  Chris Mosely was previously the CEO and founder of Blue Tongue Entertainment in 1995. RedTribe was the first Australian developer to release a game on the Xbox 360 & Wii in Australia & New Zealand.

RedTribe won the Business3000 "Export Business of the Year" and the overall "Business of the Year" awards in 2007.

Released games
Redtribe has released games on PlayStation 2, Xbox 360, Wii and PC

 Looney Tunes: Acme Arsenal - 2007 (WW)
 Space Chimps - 2008 (US)
 Jumper: Griffin's Story - 2008 (US)
 Hairy Balls for IOS devices - 2013 (WW)
 Hairy Balls for Android devices - 2014 (WW)

See also

List of companies of Australia

References

External links

Defunct video game companies of Australia
Video game development companies
Video game companies established in 2003
Video game companies disestablished in 2014